Wolf Pact is an album by Boyd Rice & Fiends (in this collaboration, Douglas P. and Albin Julius).

CD pressing
Limited to 500 copies and signed by Douglas P. & Boyd Rice.

Pressing:
Record label: Neroz
Catalog number: NEROZ CD1369

Track listing
"Watery Leviathan" - 2:29
"The Forgotten Father" - 2:55
"Tomb Of The Forgotten Father" - 2:43
"Wolf Pact" - 3:29
"Worlds Collide" - 5:01
"Their Bad Blood" - 3:12
"Rex Mundi" - 2:55
"Murder Bag" - 4:35
"The Reign Song" - 2:39
"Joe Liked To Go (To The Cemetery)" - 3:58
"Fire Shall Come" - 3:39
"The Orchid And The Death's Head" - 7:31
"For Their Whole Lives Long" - 0:26

12" vinyl pressing
Released in white and grey vinyl with 750 copies of each. Comes with printed inner sleeve and embossed cover.

Pressing:
Record label: Neroz
Catalog number: NEROZ 1369

Track listing
Side A
"Watery Leviathan"
"The Forgotten Father"
"Tomb Of The Forgotten Father"
"Wolf Pact"
"Worlds Collide"
"We Shall Purge"
"Rex Mundi"
Side B
"Murder Bag"
"The Reign Song"
"Joe Liked To Go (To The Cemetery)"
"Fire Shall Come"
"The Orchid And The Death's Head"
"For Their Whole Lives Long"
"Marglar"

Boyd Rice & Fiends — The Registered Three, CD single
Limited to 500 copies and signed by Douglas P. & Boyd Rice.

Pressing:
Record Label: Neroz
Catalog number: NEROZ 45

Track listing
"The Forgotten Father" - 2:59
"People Change" - 2:40
"The Registered Three" - 2:10

References

External links
Entry for CD pressing at discogs.com
Entry for 12" vinyl pressing at discogs.com
Entry for The Registered Three CD pressing at discogs.com

Boyd Rice albums
2001 albums